The 2014 California State Senate election was held on Tuesday, November 4, 2014, with the primary election on June 3, 2014. Voters in the 20 even-numbered districts of the California State Senate elected their representatives. The elections coincided with the elections for other offices, including the State Assembly election and the gubernatorial election.

The California Republican Party won the newly drawn 28th district and the open 34th district, gaining two seats from the California Democratic Party and ending the Democrats' supermajority in the chamber.

Overview 

† The 35th district, which was not up for election in this cycle, was vacant due to the resignation of Democrat Rod Wright.

Results

District 2

District 4

District 6

Endorsements

District 8

District 10

District 12

District 14

District 16

District 18

District 20

District 22

District 24

District 26

District 28

District 30

District 32

District 34

District 36

District 38

District 40

References

State Senate
California State Senate elections
California State Senate